"Humain à l'eau" (English: 'Human Overboard', 'Man Overboard') is a song by Stromae from his second album Racine carrée.

Chart positions

References

External links
 

2013 songs
Stromae songs
Songs written by Stromae